This is a list of covered bridges in New Brunswick. There are 58 covered bridges in the Canadian province of New Brunswick. Bridges are single span, unless noted.

Existing bridges

Defunct bridges 

In 2018, the 87-year old Bell Bridge, near Hoyt, south of Fredericton, was demolished following flood damage.

In 2017, a 104-year-old covered bridge (Hammond River No. 2) over the Hammond River was demolished and replaced with a modular bridge. According to the provincial government, local residents did not wish to save it.

In 2014, the Cherryvale covered bridge, built in 1927, was washed away by flooding on the Canaan River and destroyed.

In 2011 the Mangrum or Stormdale Bridge (Becaguimec Stream No. 3), constructed in 1909, burned following probable arson.

In 2009 the Adair Bridge (North Becaguimec No. 1), constructed in 1948, was destroyed beyond repair by an arsonist.

In 2001, the 82-year-old Mundleville covered bridge burned down. At 153 metres, it was the second longest covered bridge in the province.

References

External links

Bridges, covered

New Brunswick